Brzeziny  is a village in the administrative district of Gmina Trzcianne, within Mońki County, Podlaskie Voivodeship, in north-eastern Poland.

According to the 1921 census, the village was inhabited by 430 people, among whom 423 were Roman Catholic, and 7 Mosaic. At the same time, all inhabitants declared Polish nationality. There were 76 residential buildings in the village.

References

Brzeziny